Kieler is an unincorporated census-designated place in the Town of Jamestown in Grant County, Wisconsin. It is located about seven miles northeast of the Iowa-Wisconsin border and the city of Dubuque, Iowa, and about four miles southwest of Dickeyville, Wisconsin, along U.S. Highway 61 and U.S. Highway 151. As of the 2010 census, its population was 497.

History
The community was named after John Kieler, an immigrant from Prussia who arrived in the area in 1855.

Education
Immaculate Conception, the only Catholic church in Kieler, was constructed in 1858. The church was remodeled in 1896, when a rock exterior and two front towers were added. A 2004 addition includes a large gathering area on the west side. Holy Ghost/Immaculate Conception School serves students in grades 4 through 8. Students in kindergarten through 3rd grade attend school in Dickeyville.

Notes

External links

Immaculate Conception Parish, Kieler, Wisconsin: Centennial and Dedication of New School, 1957

Census-designated places in Grant County, Wisconsin
Census-designated places in Wisconsin